The Pakistani cricket team toured Australia in December 2016 to play three Test matches and five One Day Internationals (ODIs). The 1st Test at The Gabba in Brisbane was a day/night match played with a pink ball. In preparation for the first Test, ten matches in Pakistan's 2016–17 Quaid-e-Azam Trophy and the first round of matches in Australia's 2016–17 Sheffield Shield season were played as day/night matches. Ahead of the Test matches, Pakistan also played a first-class match against Cricket Australia XI.

This was Pakistan's 17th tour of Australia, with their previous tour occurring in 2009–10. During that tour they lost both the Test and the ODI series in a clean sweep and also lost the only T20I match. The last time that these teams met was 2014–15 in the United Arab Emirates where Pakistan won the Test series 2–0 but Australia won the ODI series 3–0. The Australians come into this Test series after recently losing their previous two series – against Sri Lanka abroad and to South Africa at home. They enter the ODI series after a 4–1 series victory against Sri Lanka, a 9 wicket win over Ireland and a 5–0 series defeat away to South Africa – the first time that Australia had lost all five matches in a five-match ODI series. However, immediately prior to this series, Australia won back the Chappell–Hadlee Trophy, defeating New Zealand in a 3–0 whitewash.

Australia won the Test series 3–0. Their victory in the third Test was their 12th consecutive win against Pakistan in Tests in Australia. Australia won the ODI series 4–1.

Squads

Mohammad Asghar was added to Pakistan's squad as back-up for Yasir Shah. After the first Test, Hilton Cartwright was added to Australia's squad. Ashton Agar and Steve O'Keefe were added to Australia's squad for third Test with Nic Maddinson and Chadd Sayers being dropped. Mohammad Hafeez was added to Pakistan's ODI squad after the conclusion of the Test series. Mohammad Irfan left Pakistan's ODI squad after the death of his mother and was replaced by Junaid Khan. Sarfraz Ahmed also left Pakistan's squad after his mother was admitted into hospital. Mitchell Marsh and Chris Lynn were withdrawn from Australia's ODI squad due to injury, with Marcus Stoinis and Peter Handscomb replacing them respectively. Billy Stanlake was not included in Australia's squad for 5th ODI as he went to New Zealand for preparation ahead of the Chappell-Hadlee series.

Tour matches

First-class match: Cricket Australia XI vs Pakistanis

50-over match: Cricket Australia XI vs Pakistanis

Test series

1st Test

2nd Test

3rd Test

ODI series

1st ODI

2nd ODI

3rd ODI

4th ODI

5th ODI

References

External links
 Series home at ESPN Cricinfo

2016 in Australian cricket
2016 in Pakistani cricket
International cricket competitions in 2016–17
Pakistani cricket tours of Australia
2016–17 Australian cricket season